The Smiths is the debut studio album by English rock band the Smiths, released on 20 February 1984 by Rough Trade Records. After the original production by Troy Tate was felt to be inadequate, John Porter re-recorded the album in London, Manchester and Stockport during breaks in the band's UK tour during September 1983.

The album was well received by critics and listeners, and reached number two on the UK Albums Chart, staying on the chart for 33 weeks. It established the Smiths as a prominent band in the 1980s music scene in the United Kingdom. The album also became an international success, peaking at number 45 in the European Albums Chart, remaining in the chart for 21 weeks. After its exit of the European chart, it then re-entered in the Hot 100 Albums from September for another run of three weeks.

Production 
After signing with independent record label Rough Trade, the Smiths began preparations to record their first album in mid 1983. Due to the suggestion of Rough Trade head Geoff Travis, the band selected Troy Tate (former guitarist of the Teardrop Explodes) as producer for sessions at Elephant studios in Wapping, London. During the following month the group recorded fourteen songs.

Guitarist Johnny Marr would later write in his autobiography that he "liked Troy...Troy's vision was to capture the way the band sounded live. He thought it was important that the record represented the way we were in the clubs and was an authentic document. He worked pretty tirelessly to get passion from a performance and was very nurturing with me..." However, the sessions would also prove to be arduous due to an ongoing heatwave in London. The Smiths were recording in a hot basement studio at Elephant, and according to Marr, not only was the heat uncomfortable but it made it difficult to keep their instruments in tune.

While recording a BBC session for Dave Jensen in August 1983, The Smiths met producer John Porter, who was working in one of the studios. Travis, harbouring reservations about the group's session with Troy Tate, gave Porter a cassette of the sessions beforehand in the hopes that he could remix them. Porter told Travis that the sessions were "out of tune and out of time". Feeling the Tate sessions were unsalvageable, Porter offered to re-record the album himself. Despite praising the work with Tate, only a week prior, to the press by stating "we've done everything exactly right and it'll show", Smiths singer Morrissey accepted (as did Travis), while Marr hesitantly agreed. Marr would later claim in his autobiography that when the band heard the finished work done under Tate, Morrissey didn't like the album and the others weren't entirely happy with the results either. "I could hear myself that the mixes sounded underproduced and were not the finished article that we needed as our introduction to the world," Marr wrote. "Why it was deemed necessary to scrap the album entirely rather than just mix it again I didn't know, but I wasn't going to make too much of it...it was a document of how the band really were at that point though...".

The Smiths began work with Porter in September 1983. Due to tour commitments, the group had to make the record in a piecemeal fashion. Marr later recalled that "working with John immediately got us results...he and I formed a musical and personal relationship that was inspiring...he nurtured not just me but all the band". Recording started at London's Matrix Studios, with the majority of the work undertaken during a week's stay at Pluto, just outside Manchester. A final overdub session was performed at Eden Studios in London that November. After listening to a finished mix of the album the following month, Morrissey told Porter and Travis that the album "wasn't good enough". However, the singer said that due to the album's cost of £6,000, "[they said] it has to be released, there's no going back".

Artwork and packaging 
The sleeve for The Smiths was designed by Morrissey. It features American actor Joe Dallesandro in a cropped still from Andy Warhol's 1968 film Flesh. The photograph of Morrissey on the original card inner sleeve was taken at an early London concert by Romi Mori, who subsequently played bass guitar for the Gun Club.

Promotion 
The single "What Difference Does It Make?" was released in January 1984, reaching number 12 on the UK Singles Chart.

Release 
The album was released on 20 February 1984, and debuted at number two on the UK Albums Chart.

"This Charming Man" was included as the sixth track on all original US releases of the album on Sire Records (LP, CD and cassette) and on the UK cassette on Rough Trade. Since 1992, when WEA acquired the Smiths' catalogue, nearly all reissues worldwide also include this song, with the exceptions being a 2009 vinyl reissue on Rhino Records in both the US and the UK and the 2011 vinyl version box set collecting the Smiths albums titled "Complete".

Legacy 

The music critic Garry Mulholland included it in his list of the 261 greatest albums since 1976 in Fear of Music: "The Smiths made safe their early legend with a debut album about child abuse. The production was flat and dour, yet it succeeded in conjuring yet another Manchester-in-song, distinctly different from that of Ian Curtis and Mark E. Smith. But everything about The Smiths ran contrary to mid-80s pop, from Joe Dallesandro on the cover to the restrained jangling of the songs, but mainly through Moz's [Morrissey's nickname] dramatised disgust at sex, which here exists to ruin true love at best, and to ruin an entire young life at worst."

Slant Magazine listed the album at 51 on its list of "Best Albums of the 1980s" saying "There's no reason why a mordant, sexually frustrated disciple of Oscar Wilde who loved punk but crooned like a malfunctioning Sinatra should've teamed up with a fabulously inventive guitarist whose influences were so diffuse that it could be hard to hear them at all and formed one of the greatest songwriting duos of the '80s." PopMatters included the album on their list of "12 Essential Alternative Rock Albums from the 1980s" saying: "Morrissey's career are fully accounted for on The Smiths, where they are rendered all the more piercing by Johnny Marr's delicate guitar-picking and John Porter's stark production".

In 1989, the album was ranked number 22 on Rolling Stone magazine's list of the 100 greatest albums of the 1980s. In 2003, the album was #481 on that magazine's list of the 500 greatest albums of all time. The magazine ranked it at #473 on an updated list in 2012, calling it "a showcase for Morrissey's morose wit and Johnny Marr's guitar chime". The album was ranked number 51 on Rolling Stones list of the 100 Best Debut Albums of All Time. It placed at number 73 in The Guardians list of the 100 Best Albums Ever in 1997.

Track listing 

Notes
 The track "This Charming Man" did not appear on the original UK LP release. It appears as the first song on side B of the American release.

Personnel 

The Smiths
 Morrissey – vocals
 Johnny Marr – guitars, harmonica
 Andy Rourke – bass guitar
 Mike Joyce – drums, tambourine 

Additional musicians
 Paul Carrack – piano, organ 
 Annalisa Jablonska – female voice 

Production
 John Porter – production , remixing 
 The Smiths – production 
 Phil Bush – engineering
 Neill King – engineering

Design
 Morrissey – sleeve
 Caryn Gough – layout

Charts

Certifications

References 

Works cited

External links 
 
 The Smiths (Adobe Flash) at Radio3Net (streamed copy where licensed)

The Smiths albums
1984 debut albums
Rough Trade Records albums
Sire Records albums
Albums produced by John Porter (musician)
Works about child abuse